Parent Trap: Hawaiian Honeymoon is a 1989 American made-for-television comedy film and a sequel to Parent Trap III (1989) and the fourth and final installment in the original The Parent Trap series. It originally aired two parts as a presentation of The Magical World of Disney on November 19 and 26, 1989.

Hayley Mills reprises her roles as twins Susan Wyatt and Sharon Grand; also returning from Parent Trap III is Barry Bostwick and the Creel triplets: Joy, Leanna, and Monica. Mollie Miller reunited with the cast to direct this film from the third film. This film was telecast only seven months after the previous sequel.

Plot
After inheriting a family resort in Hawaii from Jeffrey's late aunt, Jeffrey and Susan decide to head for Hawaii with his identical triplet teenage daughters, Lisa, Jessie and Megan, before spending their 2-week honeymoon in Australia, with Susan's twin sister Sharon Grand taking care of the girls.

They find the resort in a run-down condition, and they decide to repair it and sell it. The triplets spend most of their time at the beach having fun and meeting boys. Jeffrey meets an old high school rival, Ray, who promises to keep the resort as it is if Jeffrey will sell it to him. He has other plans in mind, however, and they are not limited merely to Jeffrey's resort.

Meanwhile, a mean resident named Charlotte Brink causes problems for everyone.

Cast
 Hayley Mills as Susan Wyatt / Sharon Grand
 Barry Bostwick as Jeffrey Wyatt
 Leanna Creel as Lisa Wyatt
 Monica Creel as Jessie Wyatt
 Joy Creel as Megan Wyatt
 Jayne Meadows as Charlotte Brink
 John M. Jackson as Ray
 Sasha Mitchell as Jack
 Glenn Shadix as Chet
 Lightfield Lewis as Tim Harris
 Joe Mays as Ben Milton
 Wayne Federman as The Delivery Man

External links 
 
 
 

1989 films
4
1989 television films
American comedy television films
Films about marriage
Films about twin sisters
Films about families
Films scored by Joel McNeely
Films set in Hawaii
NBC network original films
Television sequel films
Twins in American films
1980s English-language films